The 2009 NCAA Women's Gymnastics championship involved 12 schools competing for the national championship of women's NCAA Division I gymnastics.  It was the twenty eighth NCAA gymnastics national championship and the defending NCAA Team Champion for 2008 was Georgia.  The Competition took place in Lincoln, Nebraska hosted by the University of Nebraska in the Bob Devaney Sports Center.

The 2009 six regional fields and sites were as follows:
 North Central Regional (Carver-Hawkeye Arena, Iowa City, Iowa, Host: University of Iowa) - No. 6 Florida, No. 7 UCLA, No. 18 Minnesota, No. 20 Denver, No. 23 Iowa State, No. 28 Iowa; Saturday, April 4 at 6 p.m. CT
 Central Regional (St. John Arena, Columbus, Ohio, Host: Ohio State University) - No. 5 LSU, No. 8 Oregon State, No. 17 Ohio State, No. 22 Kent State, No. 24 Kentucky, No. 26 Michigan State; Saturday, April 4
 Northeast Regional (Coleman Coliseum, Tuscaloosa, Alabama, Host: University of Alabama, Tuscaloosa) - No. 3 Alabama, No. 9 Oklahoma, No. 15 Missouri, No. 32 Central Michigan, No. 35 New Hampshire, No. 35 Maryland; Saturday, April 4
 South Central Regional (Barnhill Arena, Fayetteville, Arkansas, Host: University of Arkansas, Fayetteville) - No. 4 Stanford, No. 10 Arkansas, No. 16 Michigan, No. 25 Arizona, No. 31 Arizona State, No. 27 Southern Utah; Saturday, April 4
 Southeast Regional (Reynolds Coliseum, Raleigh, North Carolina, Host: North Carolina State University) - No. 1 Georgia, No. 12 Penn State, No. 13 Nebraska, No. 21 West Virginia, No. 29 North Carolina State, No. 30 North Carolina; Saturday, April 4
 West Regional (Bank of America Arena, Seattle, Washington, Host: University of Washington) - No. 2 Utah, No. 11 Auburn, No. 14 Illinois, No. 19 Boise State, No. 33 Washington, No. 34 San Jose State; Saturday, April 4 at 6 p.m. PT
NCAA Championships, the Bob Devaney Sports Center, Lincoln, Nebraska (Host: University of Nebraska, Lincoln), on April 16–18.

At the national championships at Lincoln, Nebraska, the top three teams from each of the first day's sessions advancing to the Super Six Team Finals were: Georgia, Florida and LSU (first session); Alabama, Arkansas and Utah (second session). Utah used a tie breaker over UCLA to advance to the finals. Individually, top all-around title went to Georgia's Courtney Kupets who scored 39.80 points, including a perfect 10 on balance beam. Utah's Kristina Basket with 39.60 points and UCLA's Vanessa Zamarripa with 39.575 points were second and third-place finishers. Kupets became just the second three-time NCAA All-Around champion in NCAA history. Additionally, other gymnasts competing were 12 of the nation’s best all-around and four individual event specialists.

The Georgia Gym Dogs finished on top with 197.825 points to win the 2009 team championship, a record 10th NCAA title. They were followed by Alabama with 197.575 points, Utah with 197.425 points, Florida with 196.725 points, Arkansas with 196.475 points and LSU with 196.375 points at the Super Six Team Finals.

Head coach Suzanne Yoculan, in her 26th year at the helm of the University of Georgia program, retired with a record of 831-117-7 after the 2009 championship.

Champions

Team Results

Session 1

Session 2

Super Six

Top Ten Individual All-Around Results

Individual Event Finals Results

Vault

Uneven Bars

Balance Beam

Floor Exercise

References

External links
 NCAA Gymnastics Championship Official site

NCAA Women's Gymnastics championship
2009 in women's gymnastics